Thomas Vernon McGarity II (December 1, 1921 – May 21, 2013) was a United States Army soldier and a recipient of the United States military's highest decoration, the Medal of Honor, for his actions during the Battle of the Bulge in World War II.

Biography
Born in Hardin County, Tennessee on December 1, 1921, McGarity joined the army in November 1942.

By December 16, 1944, the first day of the Battle of the Bulge, he was serving near Krinkelt, Belgium as a technical sergeant in Company L of the 393rd Infantry Regiment, 99th Infantry Division. Wounded early in the battle, McGarity returned to his unit, and as squad leader, directed and encouraged his soldiers throughout the intense fight that ensued. He repeatedly braved heavy fire to rescue wounded men, attacked the advancing Germans, and retrieved supplies. After completely running out of ammunition, his squad and he were captured. For his actions during the battle, he was presented with the Medal of Honor a year later, on January 11, 1946, by President Harry S Truman.

McGarity died at the age of 91 in 2013.

Medal of Honor citation
His official citation reads:

See also

List of Medal of Honor recipients

References

1921 births
2013 deaths
United States Army personnel of World War II
People from Hardin County, Tennessee
United States Army Medal of Honor recipients
United States Army soldiers
World War II prisoners of war held by Germany
World War II recipients of the Medal of Honor
American prisoners of war in World War II